Zdeněk Sváta (born 17 August 1982) is a Czech badminton player. He was the men's doubles champion at the 2013 Giraldilla International and runner-up in the Mercosul International partnered with Jan Fröhlich.

Achievements

BWF International Challenge/Series 
Men's doubles

  BWF International Challenge tournament
  BWF International Series tournament
  BWF Future Series tournament

References

External links 
 

1982 births
Living people
Czech male badminton players